Kamsar or Komsar in Iran may refer to:
 Kamsar, Gilan
 Komsar, Sowme'eh Sara, Gilan Province
 Kamsar, Isfahan